The 1955 Howard Bulldogs football team was an American football team that represented Howard College (now known as the Samford University) as an independent during the 1955 college football season. In their first year under head coach Howard Foote, the team compiled a record of 1–8. Seniors James Chandler and Wayne Walker were the team captains.

Schedule

References

Howard
Samford Bulldogs football seasons
Howard Bulldogs football